The Billboard Music Award for Top Latin Album recognizes the most successful Latin albums on the Billboard Charts over the past year. Jenni Rivera became the first female artist to win the award at the 2013 Billboard Music Awards and won it posthumously. Prince Royce is the most nominated performer without a win, with four unsuccessful nominations.

Winners and nominees

References

Billboard awards
A
Album awards